Harare Metropolitan Province, is a province in northeastern Zimbabwe that comprises Harare, the country's capital and largest city, and three other municipalities, Chitungwiza, Epworth and Ruwa. At independence in 1980, it was originally part of Mashonaland Province which in 1983 was divided into three large provinces, Mashonaland Central, Mashonaland East, and Mashonaland West - at this point, the city of Harare became part of Mashonaland East. In 1997, along with Bulawayo, it became a metropolitan province, along with the then two nearby urban settlements. Harare Metropolitan Province is divided into four local government areas - a city council, a municipality and two local boards.

It is the second-smallest in area of the country's provinces, after the city-province of Bulawayo. As of the 2022 census, the province has a population of 2,427,209, of whom 1,849,600 live in Harare proper, 371,244 in Chitungwiza, and the remaining 206,365 in Epworth. In total, Harare Province is home to 16.26% of Zimbabwe's population, making it the country's most populous province. The province is Zimbabwe's leading political, financial, commercial, and communications centre, as well as a trade centre for tobacco, maize, cotton, and citrus fruits. Manufacturing, including textiles, steel, and chemicals, is also economically significant, as is gold mining. The province is home to several universities, a number of leading professional sports teams, and many historical sites and tourist attractions.

Etymology 
Harare Province is named after the city of Harare, which in turn took its name from a black township in the city now known as Mbare. Originally, the name "Harare" applied to a village near the Harare Kopje led by the Shona chief Neharawa, whose name meant "he who does not sleep." The city of Harare, previously named Salisbury, was renamed on 18 April 1982, the second anniversary of Zimbabwean independence. When Harare and two nearby towns were separated from Mashonaland East Province in 1997, the new province took the same name.

Geography 
It is situated in the northeastern part of the country, in the Mashonaland region. It is bordered to the north by Mashonaland Central Province, to the west by Mashonaland West Province, and to the east and south by Mashonaland East Province. The City of Harare proper covers most of the province's area, while Chitungwiza, Epworth and Ruwa take up smaller areas of the province, both bordering Mashonaland East.

Climate 
Under the Köppen climate classification, Harare Province has a subtropical highland climate (Köppen Cwb), an oceanic climate variety.

Government and politics

Provincial government 

Harare Province is overseen by the Minister of State for Harare Province, a de facto governor who oversees provincial affairs and sits in the House of Assembly of the Parliament of Zimbabwe. The governor is appointed by the President of Zimbabwe and is not appointed to a set term. Historically, the governor held the title Governor of Harare, but the office has since been renamed to align with the 2013 Constitution of Zimbabwe, which does not allow for provincial governors.

Local government areas 
Harare Province is divided into four local government areas: Harare City Council, Chitungwiza Municipality, Epworth Local Board and Ruwa Local Board.

National politics 

Like each of Zimbabwe's ten provinces, Harare Province is represented in the Senate by six senators, three of whom must be women. Senators are not directly elected by voters, but are instead selected by party lists via a proportional representation system. The province's current senators since the 2018 elections are Theresa Makone (MDC Alliance), Elias Mudzuri (MDC Alliance), Kerina Gweshe (MDC Alliance), Morgan Femai (MDC Alliance), Sipani Hungwe (ZANU–PF), Oliver Chidawu (ZANU–PF).

Harare Province is represented by 29 Members of Parliament in the House of Assembly, Zimbabwe's lower house of Parliament. The province's current MPs since the 2018 elections are Samuel Banda, Tendai Biti, Starman Chamisa, James Chidakwa, Happymore Chidziva, Wellington Chikombo, Goodrich Chimbaira, Kennedy Dinar, Shakespear Hamauswa, Chalton Hwende, Winnie Kankuni, Godfrey Karakadzay Sithole, Earthrage Kureva, Costa Machingauta, Willias Madzimure, Joanah Mamombe, Susan Matsunga, Allan Norman Markham, Tapiwa Mashakada, Maxwell Mavhunga, Tongai Mnangagwa, Peter Moyo, Erick Murai, Miriam Mushayi, Evan Mushoriwa, Job Sikhala, Unganai Tarusenga, Vimbai Tsvangirai-Java, and Murisi Zwizwai. All are members of the MDC Alliance except for Mnangagwa, a ZANU–PF member and the nephew of President Emmerson Mnangagwa.

See also 

 List of Zimbabwean provinces by population

References

 
Provinces of Zimbabwe